Hossein Ali Shahriari (Persian: حسین علی شهریاری) born in 1951 in Zabol, Iran, is a physician, politician, member of the 7th, 8th, 9th, 10th and 11th terms of the Iran Islamic parliament and the head of the Health Commission of the Iranian Parliament.

References 

1951 births
Living people
People from Sistan and Baluchistan Province
Members of the 7th Islamic Consultative Assembly
Members of the 8th Islamic Consultative Assembly
Members of the 9th Islamic Consultative Assembly
Members of the 10th Islamic Consultative Assembly
Members of the 11th Islamic Consultative Assembly